Masri, Masry or Al-Masri (commonly spelled by Egyptians) is an Arabic surname meaning the Egyptian and may refer to:

Al-Masri
 Sama El Masri, Egyptian belly dancer
 Hadi Al Masri (born 1986), Syrian footballer
 Hamdi Al Masri (born 1986), Syrian footballer
 Abu Ayyub al-Masri, Egyptian Islamic Jihad and al-Qaeda member
 Abu Hamza al-Masri, Muslim extremist cleric in prison in the United Kingdom
 Abu Khayr al-Masri, Egyptian al-Qaeda leader
 Abu Osama al-Masri, Egyptian Muslim cleric and leader of the Islamic State in Iraq and the Levant (ISIL or ISIS) branch in the Sinai Peninsula
 Abu Ubaidah al-Masri (died 2007), an al-Qaeda operative in Pakistan
 Abu Zubair al-Masri, an al-Qaeda operative originally from Egypt
 Khalid al-Masri, suspected al-Qaeda member
 Khalid El-Masri, German citizen of Lebanese origin formerly detained by the United States after extraordinary rendition
 Mohammad Hasan Khalil al-Hakim, alias Abu Jihad al-Masri, the propaganda chief of al-Qaeda
 Munib al-Masri (born 1934), Palestinian industrialist, statesman, and patriarch of the al-Masri family, serving as chairman of the Edgo Group
 Hisham Al-Masri,  Syrian former swimmer who competed in the 1992 Summer Olympics
 Majida Al-Masri, Palestinian politician
 Mutaher al-Masri, Yemeni politician and minister
 Nader al-Masri (born 1980), Palestinian Olympic athlete
 Saeed al-Masri, Egyptian who was alleged to have acted as the financial chief for al-Qaeda
 Saif al-Islam el-Masry, senior al-Qaeda member
 Taher al-Masri, former Prime Minister of Jordan
 Yasmine Al Masri, Lebanese actress
 Yasser Al-Masri (died 2018), Jordanian actor
 Zafer al-Masri (1940-1986), Palestinian businessman and head of the Nablus Chamber of Commerce, and for a brief period of 2 months, mayor of Nablus. Assassinated in 1986
 Samer al-Masry, Syrian actor

El-Masri
 Abdalla El-Masri, Lebanese-Russian composer
 Hazem El Masri (born 1976), Lebanese-Australian professional rugby league footballer
 Jaled el Masri, Syrian citizen subjected to the American program of extraordinary rendition and held in extrajudicial detention
 Samer El Masri, Lebanese-Australian rugby league player
 Rafed El-Masri, German swimmer of Syrian origin
 Sherif El-Masri (born 1990), Canadian football of Tunisian origin (soccer) player

See also
Masri (disambiguation), persons section, for people named Masri (without al- or el-)

Arabic-language surnames
Nisbas
Toponymic surnames
Ethnonymic surnames